Horrible Histories is an animated children's television series based on the Terry Deary book series of the same name. The series ran for 26 episodes and two seasons between January 1, 2001, and March 26, 2002.

Synopsis
The series is based around the adventures of Stitch and Mo, two everyday kids who are transported to various historical eras with the help of a time portal. In each episode, their historical adventures help teach them a lesson or solve a problem in their everyday lives, often involving bully Darren Dongle. Animated sidebars explain the historical details, and clarify popular misconceptions.

Characters
Stitch is one of the two main protagonists, he has black glasses and usually wears a huge dark-green T-shirt that has a rat on it and covers the rest of his body. He is shown to be lazy and loves food (especially doughnuts), and also considers himself quite a comedian. He is voiced by Billy West.
Mo is one of the two main protagonists, she wears a white T-shirt with a flower on it and green camouflage jeans. She is the brains of the pair. Mo is also shown to love animals. She is voiced by Cree Summer in the original American version and Jo Young when the show was dubbed and shown in the UK.
Darren Dongle is the main antagonist, a nerd who knows a lot about history but is shown to enjoy taunting Stitch and Mo. He is over-confident and hates it when he's wrong. He is voiced by Jess Harnell.
The Narrator is shown to be a good joker and zaps Stitch and Mo back in time to solve their situations. In Amazing Aussies, his name is revealed to be "Frank Synopsis." He is voiced by Billy West in the original American version and was dubbed by Stephen Rea when the show was dubbed and shown in the UK.

Production
Horrible Histories is based on Terry Deary's book series of the same name. Deary later said he had had a "terrible experience" with the show.

The show is produced by California-based indie Mike Young Productions (LA), Telegael Galway, and Scholastic Entertainment (NY). It marked Young's and Telegael's first collaboration. It is directed by Andrew Young (executive producer Mike Young's son) and Gordon Langley. It is produced By Martha Atwater, Tamar Simon Hoffs, Michelle Conway, Paul Cummings, Deborah Forte, Mike Young, Mark Young, Beth Richman and Charlie Stickney, among others. It is animated by Glenn Jason Hanna. It is written by Martha Atwater, Terry Deary, Charlie Stickney, Andrew Young, Gordon Langley, William Forrest Cluverius. It has a running time of 25 minutes.

On the British channel ITV, the show attracted hundreds of thousands of viewers each week. Stephen Rea did his voice recording work in Dublin.

In 2006, The Mirror held a promotion where readers had to collect 12 coupons and send them in to receive a free copy of the Horrible Histories DVD collection.

Episodes

Season 1 (2001)

Season 2 (2002)

Historical inaccuracies: 

 "Rotten Romans" – Julius Caesar did not build the Flavian Amphitheatre (Colosseum). It was built by Vespasian.
 "Revolting Revolution" – When the episode was dubbed in the UK, the narrator says at one point that George Washington died in 1793. However, the original version from the USA correctly said that George Washington died in 1799.
 "Amazing Aussies" – Sheep are not native to Australia, Europeans brought them over.

DVD release

The show's episodes have been released as single episodes, as 3-in-1 packs, or as one whole series. The series was released as a 3-disc DVD box set in 2005.

References

External links

2000s American animated television series
2001 American television series debuts
2002 American television series endings
2000s British animated television series
2001 British television series debuts
2002 British television series endings
2001 Irish television series debuts
2002 Irish television series endings
American children's animated adventure television series
American children's animated comedy television series
American children's animated education television series
American television shows based on children's books
American time travel television series
British children's animated adventure television series
British children's animated comedy television series
British children's animated education television series
British television shows based on children's books
British time travel television series
Irish children's animated adventure television series
Irish children's animated comedy television series
Animated television series about children
English-language television shows
Historical television series
Horrible Histories
Television series by Splash Entertainment
2000s American time travel television series